Blyth Offshore Wind Farm was a small coastal wind farm located  off the coast of Blyth, Northumberland, England.

History
Commissioned in December 2000 as a pilot project, the project was developed by a consortium that included E.ON, Shell Renewables, NUON and Border Wind. E.ON were in charge of operating the farm.

The project was the UK's first offshore wind farm, following the Vindeby in 1991 and Tunø in 1995, as well as being the largest offshore turbines erected in the world at the time. It helped pave the way for more than 600 bigger offshore turbines installed in British waters since then.

The wind farm was decommissioned (as required by authorities) in 2019. One turbine went for spare parts, while the other was re-erected as a training facility in Blyth harbour.

In 2012 there were plans to add a 100 MW test facility of 15 turbines at Blyth and nearby Newbiggin-by-the-Sea, supported by a government grant. The site would be administered by The National Renewable Energy Centre (Narec), based in Blyth. The test facility received planning consent in November 2013. It was planned with the Vestas V164-8MW and 66 kV cables.

The turbines have been decommissioned and replaced with five turbines further off shore. In 2021, Tenaga Nasional from Malaysia became part owner.

Design and specification
The farm consisted of two Vestas V66 2 MW turbines.

The foundations consisted of 3m diameter monopiles. Due to the nature of the rock reef on which the farm was sited the process was to drill a 3.25m diameter socket into the bedrock. The piles were then positioned centrally in the socket and grout was pumped into the annulus to complete the foundation.

References

External links

LORC Knowledge - Datasheet for Blyth Offshore Wind Farm

Wind farms in England
Power stations in North East England
Blyth, Northumberland
2000 establishments in England
2019 disestablishments in England
Energy infrastructure completed in 2000